Mikhail Mikhaylovich Zhvanetsky (6 March 1934 – 6 November 2020) was a Soviet writer, satirist and performer of Jewish origin, best known for his shows targeting different aspects of the Soviet and post-Soviet everyday life.

Zhvanetsky was born in Odesa, Ukrainian SSR, Soviet Union. His monologues and sketches were performed by Arkady Raikin, Roman Kartsev and Viktor Ilchenko. He joined the Union of Soviet Writers in 1978 and wrote several books.

Awards and honors 
Zhvanetsky was granted the following honorary titles and decorated with the following orders:
 People's Artist of Russia (2012)
 People's Artist of Ukraine (народний артист України), 1999.
 Meritorious Artist of the Russian Federation (Заслуженный деятель искусств Российской Федерации), 2001
 Merited Artist of the Autonomous Republic of Crimea, Ukraine (заслужений діяч мистецтв Автономної Республіки Крим), 2002
 Russian Order of Merit for the Fatherland, fourth class, by President Medvedev on Zhvanetsky's 75th birthday in 2009.
 President of the International Club of Odesa
 Order of Friendship of Peoples (1994)
 Independent prize "Triumph" (1994)
 Member of the Writers' Union (1978–1991)
 Honorary Citizen of Odesa (1994)
 Member of the Presidium of the Russian Jewish Congress
 Breastplate of the Foreign Ministry of Russia "for contribution to international cooperation"

Boulevard of the Arts in Odesa was renamed Boulevard Zhvanetsky (5 April 2009).

A minor planet, 5931 Zhvanetskij, discovered on  April 1, 1976, is named after him (using different transliteration of the surname).

References

External links
 

1934 births
2020 deaths
Burials at Novodevichy Cemetery
Recipients of the title of People's Artists of Ukraine
Honored Artists of the RSFSR
Recipients of the Order of Friendship of Peoples
Entertainers from Odesa
Odesa Jews
Russian satirists
Jewish Russian comedians
Recipients of the Order "For Merit to the Fatherland", 4th class
People's Artists of Russia
Russian male comedians